Aerolíneas is Spanish for "airlines". It may refer to:

Aerolíneas Argentinas, Argentine airline
 Aerolíneas de El Salvador, defunct El Salvadoran airline
Aerolíneas de Baleares, defunct Spanish airline
Aerolíneas Ejecutivas, Mexican executive travel operator
Aerolineas Estelar, Venezuelan airline
Aerolíneas Internacionales, defunct Mexican airline
Aerolíneas Mas, defunct Dominican Republican airline
Aerolíneas Paraguayas, defunct Paraguayan airline
Aerolíneas Peruanas, defunct Peruvian airline
Aerolíneas Sosa, Honduran airline
ABC Aerolíneas, Mexican airline also known as Interjet
Avolar Aerolíneas, defunct Mexican airline
TAR Aerolíneas, Mexican airline